The Waukesha Dolomite is a geologic formation in Wisconsin. It preserves fossils dating back to the Silurian period.

See also

 List of fossiliferous stratigraphic units in Wisconsin
 Paleontology in Wisconsin

References

Silurian geology of Wisconsin